Vision College is a private college located in Kelana Jaya, Selangor, Malaysia, with a campus. The college offers diploma and foundation programmes in the following fields: Ultrasonography, Nursing, Health Science, Medical Imaging, Business, Accounting, Information Technology, and Law Enforcement.

Awards and recognition 
Programmes offered by Vision College are approved by the Malaysian Qualification Agency (MQA) and the Ministry of Education (MOE).

The college itself is accredited ISO 9001, and is accorded with a five-star rating by MyQuest.

Programmes offered

Health Sciences 

 Postgraduate Diploma of Medical Ultrasonography – PgDMU (Asia)
 Diploma in Medical Imaging (DMI)
 Diploma in Health Science (DHS)
 Disploma in Nursing (DNS)
 Diploma in Physiotherapy (DIP)
 Diploma in Opticianry (DIO)
 Diploma of Biomedical Technology (DBT)
 Foundation in Science (FIS)
 Certificate in Science (CIS)

Business 

 Diploma in Law Enforcement (DLE)
 Diploma in Business Administration (DBA)
 Diploma in Accounting (DIA)
 Diploma in Hotel Management (DHM)
 Diploma in IT (DIT)
 Foundation in Business (FIB)
 Certificate in Business (CIB)

References

Colleges in Malaysia
Universities and colleges in Selangor
Educational institutions established in 2005
2005 establishments in Malaysia